The Wiradjuri people are a group of Aboriginal Australian people from central New South Wales, united by common descent through kinship and shared traditions. They survived as skilled hunter-fisher-gatherers, in family groups or clans, and many still use knowledge of hunting and gathering techniques as part of their customary life.

In the 21st century, major Wiradjuri groups live in Condobolin, Peak Hill, Narrandera and Griffith. There are significant populations at Wagga Wagga and Leeton and smaller groups at West Wyalong, Parkes, Dubbo, Forbes, Cootamundra, Darlington Point, Cowra and Young.

Name

That the Wiradjuri said , as opposed to some other word for "no", was seen as a distinctive feature of their speech, and several other tribes in New South Wales, to the west of the Great Dividing Range, are similarly named after their own words for "no". A similar distinction was made between Romance languages in medieval France, with the langues d'oc and the langues d'oïl distinguished by their word for "yes".

In his book Aboriginal tribes of Australia (1974), Norman Tindale wrote that Wiradjuri was one of several terms coined later, after the 1890s had seen a "rash of such terms", following the publication of a work by ethnologist John Fraser. In 1892, Fraser had published a revised and expanded edition of Lancelot Threlkeld's 1834 work on the Awabakal language, An Australian Grammar, in which he created his own names for groupings, such as Yunggai, Wachigari and Yakkajari.

Tindale says that some of the later terms had entered the literature, although not based on fieldwork and lacking Aboriginal support, as artificial, collective names for his "Great Tribes" of New South Wales. He writes that there was such a "literary need for major groupings that [Fraser] set out to provide them for New South Wales, coining entirely artificial terms for his 'Great tribes'. These were not based on field research and lacked aboriginal support. His names such as Yunggai, Wachigari and Yakkajari can be ignored as artifacts...During the 1890s the idea spread and soon there was a rash of such terms...Some of these have entered, unfortunately, into popular literature, despite their dubious origins."

He goes on to list the Bangarang
(Pangerang) (Vic.); Booandik (Vic. & SA); Barkunjee (Barkindji) (NSW), Kurnai (Vic.), Thurrawal (Dharawal) (NSW), Wiradjuri (NSW) and Malegoondeet (?) (Vic.) as some of these names, and mentions R. H. Mathews, A. W. Howitt and John Mathew as promulgators of the "nations" concept. However, Tindale refers to Wiradjuri in his own work (p. 200): "Wiradjuri 'Wiradjuri (Wi'raduri)".

Wiradjuri language

Wiradjuri is a Pama–Nyungan family and classified as a member of the small Wiradhuric branch of Australian languages of Central New South Wales.

The Wiradjuri language is effectively extinct, but attempts are underway to revive it, with a reconstructed grammar, based on earlier ethnographic materials and wordlists and the memories of Wiradjuri families, which is now used to teach the language in schools. This reclamation work was originally propelled by elder Stan Grant and John Rudder who had previously studied Australian Aboriginal languages in Arnhem Land.

Country
The Wiradjuri are the largest Aboriginal group in New South Wales. They once occupied a vast area in central New South Wales, on the plains running north and south to the west of the Blue Mountains. The area was known as "the land of the three rivers", the Wambuul (Macquarie), the Kalare later known as the Lachlan and the Murrumbidgee, or Murrumbidjeri.

Their eastern borders ran from north to south from above Mudgee, down to the foothills of the Blue Mountains east of Lithgow and Oberon, and east of Cowra, Young and Tumut and south to the upper Murray at Albury and east to about Tumbarumba. The southern border ran to Howlong. Its western reaches went along Billabong Creek to beyond Mossgiel. They extended southwest to the vicinity of Hay and Narrandera. Condobolin southwards to Booligal, Carrathool, Wagga Wagga, Cootamundra, Parkes, Trundle; Gundagai, Boorowa, and Rylstone, Wellington, and Carcoar all lay within Wiradjuri territory.

The Murray River forms the Wiradjuri's southern boundary and the change from woodland to open grassland marks their eastern boundary.

Social organisation
The Wiradjuri were organised into bands. Norman Tindale quotes Alfred William Howitt as mentioning several of these local groups of the tribe:
 Narrandera (prickly lizard)
 Cootamundra (kutamun turtle)
 Murranbulla (two bark canoes).

Burial rite
The Wiradjuri, together with the Gamilaraay (who however used them in bora ceremonies), were particularly known for their use of carved trees which functioned as taphoglyphs, marking the burial site of a notable medicine-man, ceremonial leader, warrior or orator of a tribe. On the death of a distinguished Wiradjuri, initiated men would strip the bark off a tree to allow them to incise symbols on the side of the trunk which faced the burial mound. The craftsmanship on remaining examples of this funeral artwork displays notable artistic power. Four still stand near Molong at the Grave of Yuranigh.

They are generally to be found near rivers where the softer earth allowed easier burial. Alfred William Howitt remarked that these trees incised with taphoglyphs served both as transit points to allow mythological cultural heroes to ascend to, and descend from, the firmament as well as a means for the deceased to return to the sky.

Lifestyle
The Wiradjuri diet included yabbies and fish such as Murray cod from the rivers. In dry seasons, they ate kangaroos, emus and food gathered from the land, including fruit, nuts, yam daisies (Microseris lanceolata), wattle seeds, and orchid tubers. The Wiradjuri travelled into Alpine areas in the summer to feast on Bogong moths.

The Wiradjuri were also known for their handsome possum-skin cloaks stitched together from several possum furs. Governor Macquarie was presented with one of these cloaks by a Wiradjuri man when he visited Bathurst in 1815.

British penetration
Wiradjuri territory was first penetrated by British colonists in 1813. In 1822 George Suttor took up an extensive lot of land, later known as Brucedale Station, after Wiradjuri guides showed him an area with ample water sources. Suttor learnt their language, and befriended Windradyne, nicknamed "Saturday", and attributed conflict to the harshness of his own people's behaviour, since the Wiradjuri were in his view, fond of white people, as they would call them. Clashes between the British settlers and the Wiradjuri however multiplied as the influx of colonist increased, and became known as the Bathurst Wars. The occupation of their lands and their cultivation began to cause famine among the Wiradjuri, who had a different notion of what constituted property.   In the 1850s there were still corroborees around Mudgee, but there were fewer clashes.

Notable people

Historical
 William Punch, massacre survivor and World War One serviceman
 Windradyne, important Aboriginal leader during the Bathurst War
 Yuranigh, a much prized guide for the explorer Thomas Mitchell, especially during his expedition to the Gulf of Carpentaria in 1845–1846. On hearing of Yuranigh's death in 1852, Mitchell put up £200 to have his gravesite marked with a tombstone.

Modern
 Kirsten Banks, astronomer
 Tony Briggs, actor, writer and producer
 Linda Burney, member of the Australian House of Representatives
 Evonne Goolagong Cawley, tennis great
 Jimmy Clements, present at the opening of Provisional Parliament House in 1927
 Paul Coe, lawyer and activist
 Kevin Gilbert, 20th century author
 Stan Grant, journalist, son of Stan Grant Sr
 Stan Grant Sr, a Wiradjuri elder and linguist
 Anita Heiss contemporary novelist
 Kate Howarth author
 Brendan “Boon” Oldfield, former Boomanulla coach
 Faye McMillan, academic
 Kerry Reed-Gilbert, poet, author and elder
 Aunty Isabel Reid (born 1932), elder and advocate for the Stolen Generation; NSW State Recipient of Senior Australian of the Year 2021; oldest living survivor of those forcibly removed under the Aborigines Protection Act 1909 (NSW), having been sent to the Cootamundra Domestic Training Home for Aboriginal Girls
 Jessa Rogers, founding principal of the Cape York Girl Academy
 Mum (Shirl) Smith MBE OAM, community activist
 Malcolm Towney aka MFC, Mayor's Office Queanbeyan NSW
 Dale Ella, community member
 Margaret Tucker, co-founder of the Australian Aborigines League
 Joyce Williams, Wiradjuri elder, health campaigner, native title activist
 Michael “Gee Wizz” Weir, mini rapper
 Neville "Uncle Chappy" Williams, land activist and proponent in the Lake Cowal Campaign
 Tara June Winch, author

Music/the arts
 Brook Andrew, contemporary artist
 Bianca Beetson, contemporary artist
 Luke Carroll, actor, presenter
 Alan Dargin, didgeridoo player
 Ella Havelka, dancer, first Indigenous person to join The Australian Ballet
 Melanie Horsnell, singer-songwriter
 Lin Onus, artist
 Harry Wedge, artist

Sporting

Rugby League
 Braidon Burns, rugby league footballer
 Laurie Daley, rugby league footballer
 Blake Ferguson, rugby league footballer
 David Grant, rugby league footballer
 Nicho Hynes, rugby league footballer
 Ben Jones, rugby league footballer
 David Peachey, rugby league footballer
 Tyrone Peachey, rugby league footballer
 Jesse Ramien, rugby league footballer
 Will Robinson, rugby league footballer
 George Rose, rugby league footballer
 Ron Saddler, rugby league footballer
 Kotoni Staggs, rugby league footballer
 Robbie Simpson, rugby league footballer
 Joel Thompson, rugby league footballer
 Brad Tighe, rugby league footballer
 Esikeli Tonga, rugby league footballer
 Willie Tonga, rugby league footballer
 Connor Watson, rugby league footballer
 Jack Wighton, rugby league footballer
 Joe Williams, rugby league footballer
 Jonathan Wright, rugby league footballer

Other sports
 Jarrod Atkinson, Australian Rules footballer
 Wally Carr, Australian Commonwealth Boxing Champion
 Sean Charles, Australian Rules footballer
 Daniel Christian, member of the Australian cricket team
 Brendon Cook, international racing driver
 Evonne Goolagong, champion tennis player
 John Kinsela, first Aboriginal Olympic wrestler
 Joel Swift, Australian and Olympic water polo player
 Tai Tuivasa, mixed martial arts and UFC Fighter
 Mariah Williams Australian Olympic hockey player
 Zac Williams, Australian Rules footballer
 David Wirrpanda, Australian Rules footballer

Places of significance
 Koonadan Historic Site, located 9 km north-west of Leeton
 The Wellington Convict and Mission Site in Wellington, a former convict settlement and Aboriginal mission.
 56 historical sites were found during survey work at Yathong Nature Reserve, including scar trees, camp sites and cave art.
 A historical site, consisting of an open campsite, was found during survey work at Nombinnie Nature Reserve.

Wiradjuri culture in fiction
The short story Death in the Dawntime, originally published in The Mammoth Book of Historical Detectives (Mike Ashley, editor; 1995), is a murder mystery that takes place entirely among the Wiradjuri people before the arrival of Europeans in Australia.

In Bryce Courtenay's novel Jessica, the plot is centred in Wiradjuri region. Jessica's best friend (Mary Simpson) was from Wiradjuri.

Noel Beddoe's novel The Yalda Crossing also explores Wiradjuri history from an early settler perspective, bringing to life a little-known massacre that occurred in the 1830s. Andy Kissane's poem, "The Station Owner's Daughter, Narrandera" tells a story about the aftermath of that same massacre, and was the inspiration for Alex Ryan's short film, Ngurrumbang.

Alternative names
The variety of spellings for the name Wiradjuri is extensive, with over 60 ways of transcribing the word registered.

Some words
  'native peach'. The English word for this in Australia, quandong, is thought to derive from the Wirandjuri term.
  'crow'. The Wiradjeri term perhaps lies behind the toponym for the town of Wagga Wagga. The reduplication may be a pluralizer suggesting the idea of "(place of) many crows". This has recently been questioned by Wiradjuri elder Stan Grant Sr and Tim Wess, an academic. The word behind the toponym is, they claim, meaning "dance", and the reduplicative would mean "many dances/much dancing".

Notes

Citations

Sources

])

 
Aboriginal peoples of New South Wales
South Coast (New South Wales)